Samantha Molina (born 10 October 1982) is an Italian rower, medal winner at senior level at the European Rowing Championships.

References

External links
 

1982 births
Living people
Italian female rowers
Rowers of Gruppo Sportivo Forestale
Rowers of Marina Militare